The Vauxhall 14 is an automobile which was produced by Vauxhall in the United Kingdom from 1922 to 1927.

As well as United Kingdom manufacture, knock-down kits were assembled in Australia.

Model M

First shown at the 1921 London Motor Show, the car reached the public in 1922.

The new car, designed by Clarence King, had a four-cylinder 2297cc side-valve engine mounted in-unit with a three-speed transmission. The separate chassis had semi-elliptic leaf springs at the front and cantilever springs at the rear. Brakes acted on the rear wheels only with a separate pair of shoes for the handbrake. Disc type wheels were fitted.

Body styles
2 door Melton tourer
4 door Princeton tourer
Bedford, Norfolk and Wyndham saloons
Kimberley limousine
Wyvern landaulette
Grafton coupe

Approximately 1800 cars were produced.

Model LM
In 1924 the LM version appeared with a higher compression engine developing  and four-speed transmission. Wire-spoked wheels replaced the disc ones. Front-wheel brakes were added in 1926. 

In 1924 the 14-40 with Princeton tourer body cost GBP595.

Approximately 3500 cars were produced.

References

14